is a Japanese surname. Notable people with the surname include:
 Kazuhito Esaki (born 1986), Japanese football player
 Leo Esaki (born 1925), Japanese physicist
 Takashi Esaki (born 1956), Japanese politician
 Teiso Esaki (1899–1957), Japanese entomologist
 Tetsuma Esaki (born 1943), Japanese politician 
 Youichiro Esaki (born 1958), Japanese politician

See also
 Esaki (restaurant), founded by sushi chef Shintaro Esaki

Japanese-language surnames